Ekspress-AM3 (meaning Express-AM3) is a Russian domestic communications satellite. It belongs to the Russian Satellite Communications Company (RSCC) based in Moscow, Russia. To provide of communications services (digital television, telephony, videoconferencing, data transmission, the Internet access) and to deploy satellite networks by applying VSAT technology to Russia and its neighbors (CIS).

Satellite description 
The satellite has a total of 29 transponders, was 16 C-band, 12 Ku-band and 1 L-band transponders. The Ekspress-AM3 Russian domestic communications satellite, built by Information Satellite Systems Reshetnev (NPO PM) for Kosmicheskaya Svyaz. The communications payload was built by the French company Alcatel Space.

Launch 
Ekspress-AM3 was launched by Khrunichev State Research and Production Space Center, using a Proton-K / Blok DM-2M launch vehicle. The launch took place at 19:41:00 UTC on 24 June 2005, from Site 200/39 at Baikonur Cosmodrome, Kazakhstan. Successfully deployed into geostationary transfer orbit (GTO), Ekspress-AM3 raised itself into an operational geostationary orbit using its apogee motor.

References 

Ekspress satellites
Spacecraft launched in 2005
2005 in Russia
Satellites using the KAUR bus